Fahavalo, Madagascar 1947, is a 2018 Malagasy historical war documentary film directed by Marie-Clémence Paes and produced by director herself with Agnès Contensou, Viviane Dahan for Laterit Productions, Cobra films and Silvão Produções respectively.

The documentary reveals the experience of 1947 fahavalo enemies against French colonial authorities in Madagascar with last living witnesses. The film received critical acclaim and won several awards at international film festivals including Documentaries of the world award at 42nd World Film festival and Special mention at Carthage Film Festival.

References

External links
 
 Fahavalo, Madagascar 1947: Fahavalo by Marie-Clémence Andriamonta-Paes
 Fahavalo, Madagascar 1947
 Fahavalo, Madagascar 1947 a film by Marie-Clémence Andriamonta-Paes

2018 films
Malagasy documentary films
2018 documentary films